The eyespot gecko (Gonatodes ocellatus) is a species of lizard in the Sphaerodactylidae family native to Tobago.

References

Gonatodes
Reptiles described in 1831
Taxa named by John Edward Gray